Joseph Ruskin (born Joseph Richard Schlafman; April 14, 1924 – December 28, 2013) was an American character actor.  

Also appeared in several underworld character roles on the tv series The Untouchables (1959-1963)

Early life
Ruskin was born in Haverhill, Massachusetts. After graduating high school in Cleveland, he served in the U.S. Navy and studied drama at Carnegie Mellon University, and began acting at the Pittsburgh Playhouse.  Although he gained his greatest recognition in television and film, he continued to appear on stage throughout his career.

Career
Ruskin appeared in an episode of The Outer Limits, called "Production and Decay of Strange Particles". He played in The Time Tunnel episode, "Revenge of the Gods", as well as two separate, two-part Mission: Impossible episodes: "Old Man Out" and "The Slave". He had a non-credited role as the voice of the Kanamits in The Twilight Zone episode, "To Serve Man", a season after playing the genie in another episode, "The Man in the Bottle". Ruskin also appeared in the Hogan's Heroes episode "The Gestapo Takeover".  In 1960, Ruskin appeared as Reed Benton in the TV western series Lawman in the episode titled "The Escape of Joe Killmer". In 1964, he appeared in an episode of the comedy-drama Kentucky Jones.

His film appearances include The Magnificent Seven (1960), Prizzi's Honor (1985), Indecent Proposal (1993) and Smokin' Aces (2006).

Star Trek
In Star Trek: The Original Series, Ruskin played the part of Galt in "The Gamesters of Triskelion", an episode of the second season, originally aired on January 5, 1968.

He appeared in Star Trek: Deep Space Nine, portraying the Klingon Tumek in two episodes, "The House of Quark" and "Looking for par'Mach in All the Wrong Places", which aired in October 1994 and October 1996 respectively. In between these episodes, he was cast as a Cardassian informant in the third-season episode "Improbable Cause".

Following this, Ruskin appeared in his only Star Trek film role, cast as a Son'a officer in Star Trek: Insurrection. He made an appearance in Star Trek: Voyager in the episode "Gravity", first airing on February 3, 1999, in which he played a Vulcan master.

Ruskin's final Star Trek appearance was in Star Trek: Enterprise. He appeared as a "Suliban" doctor in the pilot episode "Broken Bow", which aired on September 26, 2001.

Union activity
Ruskin became a board member of the Screen Actors Guild (SAG) in 1976 and served on its board until 1999. He also became the first Western Regional Vice President of Actors' Equity Association in 1979. For his dedication and service Actors Equity gave him its Lucy Jordan Award in 2003 and Patrick Quinn Award in 2013.  SAG bestowed its Ralph Morgan Award in 2011.

Death
Ruskin died on December 28, 2013, at a hospital in Santa Monica, California. He is survived by his wife Barbara, daughter and three step-daughters.

Partial filmography

 The Untouchables (1959, Episode: "Mexican Stake-out") – Fred Metcalf (uncredited)
 Hell Bent for Leather (1960) – Shad
 The Twilight Zone (1960, Episode: "The Man in the Bottle") - Genie
 The Rise and Fall of Legs Diamond (1960) – Matt Moran
 The Magnificent Seven (1960) – Flynn (uncredited)
 The Untouchables (1961, Episode: "The Seventh Vote")
 The Twilight Zone (1962, Episode "To Serve Man" - Kanamit (voice, uncredited)
 Gunsmoke (1962) "The  Gallows" Season 7, Episode 22 - The Judge
 Diary of a Madman (1963) – The Horla (voice)
 The Dakotas (1963, Episode: "Feud at Snake River") - The Rider
 Robin and the 7 Hoods (1964) – Twitch
 Get Smart (1965, Episode: "Now You See Him ... Now You Don't") – Ehrlich
 Gunsmoke (1966, Episode: "Stage Stop") – Outlaw Curt Hansen
 The Man from U.N.C.L.E. (1966, Episode: "The Her Master's Voice Affair") – Jason Sutro
 The Time Tunnel (1966, Episode: “Revenge Of The Gods”) - Sardis Ulysses’ aide 
 The Wild Wild West (1965–1967, TV Series) – Felice Munez / Viper Black
 Mission Impossible (1967, Episodes: "The Slave" Pt.I/II) – The Monarch Bakrah
 Star Trek: The Original Series (1968, Episode: "The Gamesters of Triskelion") – Galt
 Mission Impossible (1969, Episode: "The Brothers") – Colonel Hatafis
 Land of the Giants (1970, Episode: “The Secret City Of Limbo” – General Aza
 Hogan's Heroes (1970, Episode: The Gestapo Takeover) – Major Strauss
 Mission Impossible (1972, Episode: "The Puppet")
 Bogard (1974) – Scarletti
 The Six Million Dollar Man (1974–1975, TV Series) – Markos / Le Duc
 The Magician (1974, Episode: "The Illusion of the Cat's Eye") – Hassid
 The Bionic Woman (1977, Episode: "Jaime and the King") – Prime Minister Hassan
 Wonder Woman (1978, Episode: "The Man Who Wouldn't Tell") - Dr. Black (uncredited)
 The Gypsy Warriors (1978) – Grenault
 The Sword and the Sorcerer (1982) – Malcolm
 The Man Who Wasn't There (1983) – Hassan Khaffiri
 The Greatest Adventure: Stories from the Bible (1985) - (voice, episode: "Joseph and his Brother")
 Prizzi's Honor (1985) – Marxie Heller
 The Longshot (1986) – Fusco
 The Smurfs (1986) - Additional voices
 DuckTales (1987, episode: "Sphinx for the Memories") - (voice)
 Snorks (1987) - Additional voices
 Saturday the 14th Strikes Back (1988) – Kharis
 The Adventures of Don Coyote and Sancho Panda (1990) - Additional voices
 Indecent Proposal (1993) – Pit Boss
 Deadly Exposure (1993) – Abe
 The Criminal Mind (1993) – Manny Kohen
 Firepower (1993) – Drexal
 CyberTracker (1994) – Rounds
 Star Trek: Deep Space Nine (episodes: "The House of Quark" (1994), "Improbable Cause" (1995) and "Looking for par'Mach in All the Wrong Places", TV Series) – Tumek / Informant
 Spider-Man (1995, episodes: "Neogenic Nightmare Chapter 4: The Mutant Agenda," "Neogenic Nightmare Chapter 5: Mutants Revenge," "Neogenic Nightmare Chapter 13: Shriek of the Vulture") - Lewald (voice)
 Star Trek: Insurrection (1998) – Son'a Officer #3
 Star Trek: Voyager (1999, Episode: "Gravity") – Vulcan Master
 Star Trek: Enterprise (2001, Episode: "Broken Bow") – Suliban Doctor
 Wishcraft (2002) – Taxidermist
 The Scorpion King (2002) – Tribal Leader
 The Streetsweeper (2002)
 Diamond Zero (2005) – Quentin Leeds
 Smokin' Aces (2006) – Primo Sparazza

References

External links

 
 

1924 births
2013 deaths
20th-century American male actors
21st-century American male actors
American male television actors
Male actors from Massachusetts
People from Haverhill, Massachusetts
Jewish American male actors
United States Navy personnel of World War II
Carnegie Mellon University alumni